Knypersley Reservoir near Biddulph, Staffordshire, England, was built in 1827 to supply water to the Caldon Canal, along with two others at Stanley Pool and Rudyard Lake.

It is the only reservoir along the course of the River Trent.

There are two adjacent lakes at the site, the upper Serpentine Pool feeding the lower Knypersley Pool or reservoir. Designed by Thomas Telford, it was constructed by the waterways engineer James Potter. There were a number of problems both during and after construction with settlement of the dam, and a number of repairs had to be made.

In 2006, substantial improvements were made by British Waterways, and it is currently operated and managed by their successors, the Canal & River Trust, as part of the Caldon Canal group which also includes Stanley Pool and Rudyard Lake.

The fishing rights are owned separately by a consortium of local angling clubs, the Cheshire and North Staffs Angling Association.

The fishery is known for its stocks of large fish, notably bream, but also includes roach, perch, pike and a few carp that due to their low numbers are not easy to catch. The association manages the fishery on a catch and release basis.

References

Reservoirs in Staffordshire
Canal reservoirs in England
RKnypersley
Biddulph